Belvidere High School is located in at 1500 East Avenue, Belvidere, Illinois in Boone County.

History

On the afternoon of April 21, 1967, an F4 tornado struck the school, killing 13 students and staff, tossing buses as students were being dismissed. The tornado was part of the 1967 Oak Lawn tornado outbreak. It was the sixth worse loss of life at an American school as a result of tornadoes, and the worst since 1955.

To mark the 40th anniversary of the tragedy, a memorial to the lives lost in the tornado was erected in front of Belvidere High School in 2007.

Athletics
Belvidere competes in the Northern Illinois Conference (NIC-10), and is a member of the Illinois High School Association (IHSA).  Teams are stylized as the Bucs (a shortening of Buccaneers).

BHS Sports: Football, Poms, Cheerleading, Basketball, Dance, Baseball, Tennis, Bowling, Track & Field, Soccer, Softball, Golf, Volleyball, Swimming, and Cross Country.

The school won back–to–back state championships in football in the autumns of 1993 and 1994.

Belvidere High School's current biggest rival is Belvidere North High School. Before that school was created, however, Rockford Boylan Central Catholic High School was their biggest sports rival.

The Bucs branding is also carried over to Belvidere South Middle School.

Notable alumni
Jeanne Gang ’82, award-winning architect, founder of Studio Gang Architects, and designer of the world's two tallest skyscrapers designed by a woman, Aqua and the St. Regis Chicago

References

External links
 Official website
 IHSFW.com's Belvidere H.S. Football page - sports web site

Public high schools in Illinois
Belvidere, Illinois
Schools in Boone County, Illinois